Highway 39 is a minor 29 km (19 mi) long spur route in the Regional District of Fraser-Fort George.  It runs from a point on the John Hart Highway just north of Tudyah Lake northwest to the town of Mackenzie, near the southern arm of Williston Lake.  Highway 39 and the town of Mackenzie were both built in the 1960s as a measure of support for workers on the construction project of the W. A. C. Bennett Dam (which is not on the same arm of Williston Lake as Mackenzie).  The road did not gain its '39' designation until 1975.

039